Eurypteridae is an extinct family of eurypterids that lived in the Silurian and Devonian periods. The family is one of three families contained in the superfamily Eurypteroidea (along with Dolichopteridae and Strobilopteridae), which in turn is one of the superfamilies classified as part of the suborder Eurypterina. The family contains two genera, Erieopterus and Eurypterus.

See also
 List of eurypterid genera
 Timeline of eurypterid research

References

Eurypteroidea
Devonian animals
Silurian animals
Prehistoric arthropod families